David Llorente (born 16 December 1996) is a Spanish slalom canoeist who has competed at the international level since 2014.

He won two medals at the 2019 ICF Canoe Slalom World Championships in La Seu d'Urgell, with a gold in the K1 team event and a silver in the K1 event.

Llorente qualified to represent Spain in the K1 event at the delayed 2020 Summer Olympics in Tokyo, where he finished 10th.

References

External links

Living people
Spanish male canoeists
1996 births
Medalists at the ICF Canoe Slalom World Championships
Canoeists at the 2020 Summer Olympics
Olympic canoeists of Spain
21st-century Spanish people